Poing station is a railway station in the municipality of Poing, located in the Ebersberg district in Bavaria, Germany.

References

Railway stations in Bavaria
Munich S-Bahn stations
Buildings and structures in Ebersberg (district)